The end time (also called end times, end of time, end of days, last days, final days, doomsday, or eschaton) refers to:

 Eschatology in various religions—beliefs concerning the final events of history or the destiny of humanity

End Time, End Times, or Endtime may also refer to:

Scientific and social concerns about a planetary disaster
 Apocalyptic and post-apocalyptic fiction
 Global catastrophic risk
 Global catastrophe scenarios
 Human extinction
 List of dates predicted for apocalyptic events
 Predictions and claims for the Second Coming
 Societal collapse
 Timeline of the far future

Artistic and scholarly works
 "Endtime", a song by Katatonia from the album Brave Murder Day
 "End Times" (Breaking Bad), a 2011 episode of Breaking Bad
 "End Times", a photographic series by Jill Greenberg
 End Times (album), a 2010 album by the Eels
 "End Times", song by the Eels from End Times 
 "End Times", song by Ghostpoet from Dark Days + Canapés
 End Times (book), a 2019 exploration of human extinction risk by Bryan Walsh

Other uses
 Endtime Ministries, a Christian organization

See also
 End of days (disambiguation)
 End of the world (disambiguation)

Biblical phrases
Eschatology
Mythology
Prophecy
Last events
Ultimate fate of the universe